Biratnagar High Court is the provincial court and High Court located in Biratnagar . The High Court can initiate a contempt of court case and punish according to the law against anyone obstructing its or its subordinate court’s act of judicial
execution or not abiding by its order or verdict.

Appointment of Chief Judge 
Chief Judge is appointed by Honourable chief Justice of Nepal on recommendations of judicial council.

Judges

References

Courts in Nepal